Arenocoris is a genus of true bug in the family Coreidae.

Species
These four species belong to the genus Arenocoris:

 Arenocoris fallenii (Schilling, 1829)
 Arenocoris intermedius (Jakovlev, 1883)
 Arenocoris latissimus Seidenstucker, 1960
 Arenocoris waltlii (Herrich-Schäffer, 1835)

References

Pseudophloeinae
Insects described in 1834
Hemiptera of Europe